Nancy A. Hann is a rear admiral in the NOAA Commissioned Officer Corps. She is the commanding officer of the corps and director of the National Oceanic and Atmospheric Administration (NOAA) Office of Marine and Aviation Operations (OMAO). She previously served as the deputy director.

Early life
Nancy Hann grew up in Illinois, as a child she recalled one of her favorite things was to watch the thunderstorms. She's always been interested in Earth's weather and her mother claimed she had been interested in weather patterns since the beginning.

Career
Hann started her career with NOAA as a fisheries observer in 1996 and she commissioned as an officer in the NOAA Corps 1999. She served on commercial fishing vessels, various NOAA ships and aircraft and NSF research vessels, on the NOAA aircraft she was a pilot and flight meteorologist. She even later became NOAA Dive qualified and became unmanned aircraft systems (uas), pilot. She is responsible for the direct leadership and management of OMAO's operational assets, including the agency's fleet of 16 research and survey vessels and nine aircraft.

Prior Assignments:
Commanding officer of the NOAA Aircraft Operations Center
Office of Marine and Aviation Operations Chief of Staff.
Executive Officer at the NOAA Marine Operations Center-Atlantic
Associate Director at the Atlantic Oceanographic and Meteorological Laboratory
NOAA liaison to the U.S. Pacific Command.

In July 2021, RDML Hann was nominated for promotion to rear admiral (two-stars) and assignment as the new director of the NOAA Commissioned Officer Corps, succeeding retired Rear Admiral Michael J. Silah. She was confirmed on November 16, 2021.

Education
A.S. in Project Management at George Washington University
B.A. in Marine Science and Biology at the University of San Diego
M.S. in Space Studies and Remote Sensing at Embry-Riddle Aeronautical University
M.P.A at the Harvard University Kennedy School

Awards

References

National Oceanic and Atmospheric Administration Commissioned Officer Corps admirals
Recipients of the Department of Commerce Silver Medal
Recipients of the Department of Commerce Bronze Medal
George Washington University alumni
Embry–Riddle Aeronautical University alumni
University of San Diego alumni
Harvard Kennedy School alumni
Year of birth missing (living people)
Living people